The Wellington Dukes are a Junior "A" ice hockey team from Wellington, Ontario, Canada.  They are in the Eastern Division of the Ontario Junior Hockey League and used to be a part of the Metro Junior A Hockey League.  Originally a Junior C team in the 1970s and 1980s, the Dukes merged with the neighbouring Jr. B Belleville Bobcats and took their place in the Metro League.  The Dukes have won the Dudley Hewitt Cup as Central Canadian Junior A Champions twice (2003, 2011). The Dukes won the Buckland Cup on April 22, 2018.

History
In the 1970s and early 1980s, the Wellington Dukes were members of the Quinte-St. Lawrence Junior C Hockey League.  The league folded in 1986.  The Dukes joined the Central Junior C Hockey League in 1986.  They moved up to Metro "B" in 1989 when they took over the Belleville Bobcats franchise, and moved up to Junior "A" in 1991.  The Dukes have been in the OPJHL since 1998.
In 2003, the Dukes defeated the Aurora Tigers 4-games-to-2 to win the Frank L. Buckland Trophy. At the Dudley Hewitt Cup tournament, the Dukes first beat the Fort Frances Borderland Thunder of the Superior International Junior Hockey League by a score of 7–1.  They were defeated 2-1 by the North Bay Skyhawks of the Northern Ontario Junior Hockey League.  They then defeated the Thunder Bay Bulldogs of the SIJHL 7–4 to finish second in the round robin.  In the semi-final, the Dukes defeated Fort Frances 4–2.  In the final, they defeated the North Bay Skyhawks by a convincing score of 4–0 to win the Central Canadian Championship.

At the Royal Bank Cup 2003, their National tournament started with a 4–1 loss to the Saskatchewan Junior Hockey League's Humboldt Broncos.  In the second game, the Dukes were embarrassed by the Alberta Junior Hockey League's Camrose Kodiaks 7–1.  In the third game, the Dukes battled for their lives.  In a hard battle with the Charlottetown Abbies of the Maritime Junior A Hockey League the Dukes prevailed 1–0 in overtime.  Their final round robin game, the Dukes defeated the Lennoxville Cougars of the Quebec Junior AAA Hockey League 5–2 to finish third in the round robin.  In the semi-finals, the Dukes squared off against Humboldt again and were defeated 3–2.  Humboldt moved on to win the Royal Bank Cup as National Champions.

In 2008, the Dukes joined the semi-autonomous Central Division, that formed the Central Canadian Hockey League in 2009 when the OJHL was dissolved.

The Wellington Dukes defeated the hosts Huntsville Otters 5–3 to win the 2011 Dudley-Hewitt Cup. The Dukes travelled west to participate in the Royal Bank Cup in Camrose, Alberta. Wellington returned to the Quinte after a 4–1 loss to the Vernon Vipers.

Wellington was chosen to host the 2014 Dudley-Hewitt Cup at their new arena. The Dukes finished no higher than 5th in the North-East conference losing to the Cobourg Cougars in the first round 4 games to 1. The Dukes endured nearly 2 months of a playoff layoff. The Dukes entered the tournament. The Dukes finished the round robin with a 3–0 record, but lost the final to the Toronto Lakeshore Patriots 2–1.

The franchise scoring record was set by Howie Dowdle in 1988-89 scoring 51 goals, and 73 assists in 39 games played. This feat won Howie the Elleanor Gilliam Memorial Trophy as the Central Ontario Jr. "C" Scoring Champion.

Season-by-season record
Note: GP = Games Played, W = Wins, L = Losses, T = Ties, OTL = Overtime Losses, GF = Goals for, GA = Goals against

Playoffs
MetJHL Years
1990 Lost Quarter-final
Kingston Voyageurs defeated Wellington Dukes 4-games-to-3
1991 Lost Quarter-final
Oshawa Legionaires defeated Wellington Dukes 4-games-to-2
1992 Lost Preliminary
Pickering Panthers defeated Wellington Dukes 3-games-to-none
1993 Lost Semi-final
Wellington Dukes defeated North York Rangers 4-games-to-none
Wexford Raiders defeated Wellington Dukes 4-games-to-none
1994 Lost Quarter-final
Thornhill Islanders defeated Wellington Dukes 4-games-to-1
1995 Lost Quarter-final
Wexford Raiders defeated Wellington Dukes 4-games-to-2
1996 Lost Quarter-final
Wexford Raiders defeated Wellington Dukes 4-games-to-1
1997 Lost Preliminary
Quinte Hawks defeated Wellington Dukes 4-games-to-1
1998 Lost Quarter-final
Oshawa Legionaires defeated Wellington Dukes 3-games-to-2
OJHL Years

Dudley Hewitt Cup
Central Canada Jr. A ChampionshipsNOJHL – OJHL – SIJHL – HostRound-robin play with 2nd vs. 3rd in semifinal to advance against 1st in the finals.

Royal Bank Cup
Canadian Jr. A National ChampionshipsDudley Hewitt Champions – Central, Fred Page Champions – Eastern, Doyle Cup Champion – Pacific, ANAVET Cup Champion – Western, and HostRound-robin play with top four in semifinal games and winners to finals.

Notable alumni
Sean Brown
Matt Cooke
Andrew Raycroft
Liam Reddox
Derek Smith

External links
Dukes Webpage

Ontario Provincial Junior A Hockey League teams